Temnothorax kutteri is a species of ant in the genus Temnothorax. It is native to southern France and eastern Iberia, from the Pyrenees to the Sierra Nevada. The species parasitises other ant species in the genus Temnothorax.

References

External links

Hymenoptera of Europe
Myrmicinae
Slave-making ants
Insects described in 1973
Taxonomy articles created by Polbot
Taxobox binomials not recognized by IUCN